Ríu Ríu Chíu, sometimes shortened to Ríu Ríu or Ríu Chíu, is a Spanish villancico that has attained some contemporary fame as a Christmas carol.

Origins
The villancico is attributed by some sources to Mateo Flecha the Elder, who died in 1553; it has also been described as anonymous.  The song also bears a strong resemblance to another villancico, Falalanlera, by Bartomeu Càrceres, an Aragonese composer.  It is known from a single source, the Cancionero de Upsala, published in 1556 in Venice; a unique copy is preserved at the library of the University of Uppsala. The song appears as the fortieth song of that collection.  Daniel R. Melamed described the song as "redoubtable", and mentions it as a contender for the best known piece of Renaissance music.

The apparently nonsense syllables ríu ríu chíu are often taken to represent the song of a nightingale, while the context and etymology are compatible with the call of a kingfisher.

Riu translates as river in the Catalan language, in agreement with the birth place of the accredited composer, and was translated as river by The Monkees, where the roaring river prevented a wolf from crossing to attack sheep.

Themes

The basic theme of the song is the nativity of Christ and the Immaculate Conception.  The refrain which gives the villancico its title goes:

Ríu, ríu, chíu, la guarda ribera,
Dios guardó el lobo de nuestra cordera.
"[With a cry of] Ríu, ríu, chíu, the kingfisher, God kept the wolf from our Lamb [Mary, spared of original sin at birth]."

The Immaculate Conception is mentioned in the lyrics:

El lobo rabioso la quiso morder
Mas Dios Poderoso la supo defender
Quísola hacer que no pudiese pecar
Ni aun original esta virgen no tuviera.

"The raging wolf sought to bite her, but God Almighty knew (how) to defend her; He chose to make her so that she could not sin; no original sin was found in that virgin."

The song also mentions themes of the Incarnation and Christmas:

Éste que es nacido es el Gran Monarca
Cristo Patriarca de carne vestido
Hamos redimido con se hacer chiquito
Aunque era infinito finito se hiciera.
"This one that is born is the Great King, Christ the Patriarch clothed in flesh.  He redeemed us when He made himself small, though He was Infinite He would make himself finite."

Yo vi mil Garzones que andavan cantando
Por aqui volando haciendo mil sones
Diciendo a gascones Gloria sea en el Cielo
Y paz en el suelo pues Jesús nasciera.

"I saw a thousand boys (angels) go singing, here making a thousand voices while flying, telling the shepherds of glory in the heavens, and peace to the world since Jesus has been born"

Performances
Classical and early music performers of the song include the Boston Camerata and the Oxford Camerata. 

In 1967, the Monkees performed the song live on a Christmas episode of their TV series entitled "The Monkees' Christmas Show". A studio version was released on subsequent compilation albums (and later on the 2018 album Christmas Party). The Monkees' producer, Chip Douglas, had performed it himself with his former band, the Modern Folk Quartet, on their 1964 album Changes.

The song was performed in Spanish at King's College, Cambridge in a 1992 Christmas Eve broadcast service entitled "Nine Lessons and Carols".

The song has appeared on the following albums:

 Goin' Places (1961) by The Kingston Trio (listed as "Guardo el Lobo" and credited to musicologist Erich Schwandt)
 Our Heart's Joy: A Chanticleer Christmas (1990) by Chanticleer
 The Season (1990) by Fred Penner
 Christmas (1993) by Bruce Cockburn
 Christmas Around the World (2000) by Bradley Joseph
 Cynara (2000) by Anúna.
 Midwinter (2003) by The McDades with Terry McDade 
 The Dawn of Grace (2008) by Sixpence None the Richer
 Christmas from the Heart (2009) by David Archuleta
 Deepest December (2015) by Patricia O'Callaghan

See also
 List of Christmas carols

References

External links
Complete rhyming translations of "Riu Riu Chiu" into English and Esperanto, with simple melody score
Covers on WhoSampled
Recording (1961) by The Kingston Trio
Recording (1967) by The Monkees

Spanish-language Christmas carols
Marian hymns
The Monkees songs
Catalan music